American musician Kid Rock has released 12 studio albums, one compilation album, two extended plays and one live album. His debut album, Grits Sandwiches for Breakfast, was released by Jive Records in 1990. Following its release, Kid Rock was dropped and shuffled between an independent artist and label-signed for most of the 1990s until he created his own Top Dog label and released his mainstream debut album, Devil Without a Cause, on August 18, 1998, via Atlantic Records. The album was certified diamond by the RIAA and sold 11 million copies in the United States. From 1999 to 2000 he produced four major Billboard "Hot 100" hits: "Bawitdaba", "Cowboy", "Only God Knows Why", and "American Bad Ass".

He crossed over to the country charts in 2003 with "Picture", a duet with Sheryl Crow. Cocky was released in 2001 as the follow up to Devil Without a Cause and sold 5 million copies, followed by 2003's Kid Rock and 2006's Live Trucker. Live Trucker was Kid Rock's first live release, going Gold and selling over 600,000 copies. In 2007, Kid Rock made his comeback with Rock n Roll Jesus, which was certified triple platinum. In 2008, Kid Rock had his biggest hit to date with "All Summer Long". It reached number 1 in eight countries and hit number 23 in the United States. Born Free was released in 2010 and went platinum.

Kid Rock has sold 25 million albums in the US as of December 2013, and over 35 million worldwide.

Albums

Studio albums

Live albums

Compilation albums

Extended plays

Singles

As lead artist 

Notes

"Cucci Galore", "Happy New Year" and "Redneck Paradise" were also singles off 2012's Rebel Soul; however, none of them charted.

UK promotional singles include "Somebody's Gotta Feel This", "Fist of Rage" and "Where U at Rock" from Devil Without a Cause. "Lay It On Me", "Cocky", "I'm Wrong But You Ain't Right", "Midnight Train to Memphis" and "WCSR" from Cocky were released as promotional singles in Sweden. "Do It for You" from Kid Rock was released as a promotional single in the US and featured in a commercial that ran on CMT. "New Orleans" from Rock n Roll Jesus was also a US promotional single, as was "Johnny Cash" from First Kiss, which also had a music video made for it.

A Promo single was made for the Neptune's Remix of "Cowboy" in 1999.

B-sides include "Pimp of the Nation", "Wax the Booty", "Balls in Your Mouth", "3 Sheets to the Wind", "In So Deep" (Echo Mix), "Wasting Time" (live), "Paid", "My Oedipus Complex", "I'm a Dog", "Guilty", "Rock n Roll Pain Train", "Son of Detroit" (live), "Bawitdaba" (live), "Jesus and Bochepus" and "Wasting Time" (Remix). "Jesus and Bochepus" charted at number 42 on Hot Rock Songs chart, Rock's only B-side to have charted.

As featured artist

Other appearances

Album appearances

Soundtrack appearances

Music videos

As lead artist

As featured artist

Notes

References

Country music discographies
Discographies of American artists
Hip hop discographies
Rock music discographies